This is a list of formal impeachments, impeachment attempts or impeachment inquiries of presidents, or holders of other offices equivalent to a head of state.

Successful impeachments 
Successful removal from office by legislature is indicated in bold:

Resigned during the impeachment attempt

Fled the country during the impeachment attempt

Failed impeachment attempts

See also 
 List of prime ministers defeated by votes of no confidence

References 

Politics-related lists
Impeached
Political corruption